Union Township is a township in Crawford County, in the U.S. state of Missouri.

The township was previously known as Watkins Township sometime before 1870.

References

Townships in Missouri
Townships in Crawford County, Missouri